Operation Zarin (Unternehmen Zarin ) was a minelaying operation off the north-western coast of the islands of Novaya Zemlya in the Arctic Ocean, conducted between 24 September and 28 September 1942 by the German heavy cruiser  and the destroyers , , , and . The mines laid during the operation had little effect.

Background 

During Convoy PQ 17 the Germans had noticed that freighters were going so far as possible north in the Arctic and were using the coasts of Novaya Zemlya as cover to go to Murmansk or Arkhangelsk. Operation Zar began when on 24 August the minelayer Ulm was sent to Cape Zhelania, the northern point of Novaya Zemlya, to lay a minefield. The minefield would force Allied ships to steer more to the south and bring them into range of the German bomber aircraft stationed in Norway. The sortie of Ulm was detected by Ultra and the British ordered the US heavy cruiser  to direct its three destroyer escorts to intercept her. The cruiser and the destroyers were returning from the Soviet Union after delivering the ground crews and equipment for Operation Orator. The British destroyers ,  and  found Ulm south-east of Bear Island on 25 August and sank her, before she could lay mines. The loss of Ulm greatly diminished the German ability to lay mines and forced them to use the heavy cruiser .

Sortie 

A new operation was needed and after a false start on 23 September, Admiral Hipper ( [Rear-Admiral] Wilhelm Meisel) left the base in the Altafjord the next day with 96 naval mines on deck. Command was given to Vice Admiral Oskar Kummetz. Z23, Z28, Z29 and Z30 escorted Admiral Hipper until the morning of 26 September. In the evening the minefield was laid on the northwest coast of Novaya Zemlya. Admiral Hipper picked up radio traffic from ships nearby and Meisel wanted to investigate but Kummetz was more prudent and returned to the destroyers. The ships arrived back at Kaafjord on 28 September.

Aftermath 
No ships are known to have run into the minefield. Enigma had not given forewarning of the sortie and an agent report from Stockholm, that  had sailed on 24 September, was not received by the Admiralty until 27 September.

Footnotes

References 

 
 
 
 
 

Arctic naval operations of World War II
Naval battles of World War II involving Germany
September 1942 events
Military operations of World War II
Military operations of World War II involving Germany
Arctic convoys of World War II